The second Annual American Music Awards were held on February 18, 1975.

Winners and nominees

1975